The String Quartet No. 5, Sz. 102, BB 110 by Béla Bartók was written between 6 August and 6 September 1934. It is one of six string quartets by Bartok.

The work is in five movements:

Like the String Quartet No. 4 and several other works by Bartók, the piece is in an arch form.

Additionally, the first movement, which is in a sort of sonata form, is itself arch-like, in that each section of exposition is given in reverse order during the recapitulation – the melodies of each section are also inverted (played upside-down). Bartók himself pointed out that the keys used in the movement ascend in the steps of the whole tone scale: the exposition is in B, C and D; the development is in E; and the recapitulation is in F, A and B.

The last movement is again arch-like: Bartók described it as being in the form ABCB′A′ with a coda to round things off.

The two slow movements, the second Adagio molto and the fourth Andante are great examples of Bartók's night music style: eerie dissonances, imitations of natural sounds, and lonely melodies.

The work was commissioned by Elizabeth Sprague Coolidge and is dedicated to her. It was premiered by the Kolisch Quartet in Washington, D.C. on 8 April 1935 and first published in 1936 by Universal Edition.

Discography

References

Further reading
 Antokoletz, Elliott.  The Music of Béla Bartók: A Study of Tonality and Progression in Twentieth-Century Music. Berkeley: University of California Press, 1984.
 Chapman, Roger E. "The Fifth Quartet of Béla Bartók", Music Review (1951).

External links

1934 compositions
Compositions that use extended techniques
Music commissioned by Elizabeth Sprague Coolidge
5